The Southern Republican Leadership Conference (SRLC) is a political event held in the Southern United States before each presidential election. The event is attended by Republican Party activists, elected officials, and candidates for office. It has featured every major Republican presidential candidate since Ronald Reagan, and is best known for its presidential straw poll, which receives national media attention. In 2011, the event was dubbed the Republican Leadership Conference before restoring its original name for 2012.

2015 conference

Straw poll

2014 conference
The 2014 Republican Leadership Conference was held in New Orleans, and featured various speakers such as RNC Chairman Reince Priebus, Louisiana Governor Bobby Jindal, Former Alaska Governor Sarah Palin, Phil Robertson of Duck Dynasty fame, Family Research Council head Tony Perkins, Former Mississippi Governor Haley Barbour, businessman and later President Donald Trump, Louisiana Senator David Vitter, Colonel and former Congressman Allen West, former US Speaker of the House Newt Gingrich, Utah Senator Mike Lee, Texas senator Ted Cruz, businessman and former presidential candidate Herman Cain, former Pennsylvania senator and former presidential candidate Rick Santorum, Louisiana Congressman Bill Cassidy, Congresswoman and former presidential candidate Michele Bachmann, and Texas governor and former presidential candidate Rick Perry.

Straw poll
Texas senator Ted Cruz narrowly won the 2014 straw poll, barely defeating Dr. Ben Carson. Senator Rand Paul came in a distant third, while former Arkansas governor Mike Huckabee and Texas governor Rick Perry rounded out the top 5.

2011 conference
The 2011 event featured various speakers, including Governors, Senators, state legislators, and authors. It was attended by several candidates, and potential candidates, for President of the United States, including Congresswoman Michele Bachmann, businessman Herman Cain, former Speaker of the House Newt Gingrich, former Governor Gary Johnson, Congressman Ron Paul, Governor Rick Perry, former Governor Buddy Roemer and former Senator Rick Santorum. Other speakers at the conference included Governors Bobby Jindal and Haley Barbour, and Barack Obama impersonator Reggie Brown.

Straw poll
Congressman Ron Paul won the straw poll by a large margin, with Governor Jon Huntsman, Jr., who was scheduled to speak at the event but cancelled, placing second. Congresswoman Michele Bachmann and businessman Herman Cain placed in a close third and fourth.

2010 conference
The 2010 convention was attended by U.S. Representative and 2008 presidential candidate Ron Paul of Texas; Republican National Committee Chair Michael Steele; and former Alaska Governor and 2008 vice presidential candidate Sarah Palin.

Straw poll
Mitt Romney won the presidential straw poll by a single vote. Both Romney and Ron Paul received 24 per cent of the vote. Potential 2012 presidential candidates Senator John Thune of South Dakota, Governor Haley Barbour of Mississippi, Governor Bobby Jindal of Louisiana and Governor Rick Perry of Texas asked for their names not to be included on the straw poll ballot.

2006 conference

Straw poll
Then-Senate Majority Leader Bill Frist won the 2006 straw poll.

References

External links

 2012 Southern Republican Leadership Conference
 2011 Republican Leadership Conference
 2010 Southern Republican Leadership Conference

Republican Party (United States)